Brian Ernest Blake (born August 26, 1960) is an American logger, forester, and politician who served as a member of the Washington House of Representatives, representing the 19th district from 2002 to 2021. He is a member of the Democratic Party.

References

Democratic Party members of the Washington House of Representatives
Living people
21st-century American politicians
1960 births